Sarcophyte is a genus of flowering plants belonging to the family Balanophoraceae.

Its native range is Ethiopia to Southern Africa.

Species
Species:

Sarcophyte piriei 
Sarcophyte sanguinea

References

Balanophoraceae
Santalales genera